Foxton is a town in the Manawatū-Whanganui region of New Zealand - on the lower west coast of the North Island, in the Horowhenua district,  southwest of Palmerston North and just north of Levin. The town is located close to the banks of the Manawatu River. It is situated on State Highway 1, roughly in the middle between Tongariro National Park and Wellington.

Foxton has preserved its heritage - both Maori and Pakeha - through its parks, heritage buildings and four museums. The Manawatu River Loop and estuary creates an environment that features walkways and Ramsar wetlands with 93 species of birds.

Changing identity
The 50 or so flax mills that once operated in Foxton's vicinity slowly disappeared before WWII, while the Feltex carpet factory closed in 2008, causing unemployment. What was once an industrious flax industry town, had to reinvent itself.

These days, Foxton is trying to create a new local economy, by attracting visitors from throughout the region. Several cafés intersperse the boutique shops on Main Street. A Cultural Park includes a Dutch windmill, a Maori carving workshop and the Flax Stripper Museum. De Molen hosts some 45,000 customers p.a. - while the multi-cultural community and visitor hub Te Awahou Nieuwe Stroom, attracts some 150,000 users through its doors annually.

As the centre piece of the Cultural Park, the Te Awahou Nieuwe Stroom facility was awarded a top 'excellence' museum award in 2018. The Piriharakeke and Oranjehof museums, a gallery, and exhibitions enable visitors to reflect on their own heritage and family’s roots. The multi-cultural and multi-lingual Te Awahou Nieuwe Stroom reflects diversity, and offers learning spaces through its library, heritage room and children's area with educational toys.

Foxton Beach caters to those interested in active life-style pursuits. The award-winning Pump Track lets bikes and a skate-boards speed around a circuit with berms and 'rollers' (mounds), that the riders use (instead of pedalling) to gather velocity and keep momentum.

According to the Department of Conservation: "The diversity and number of wading and shore birds that visit the Manawatu Estuary make it one of the best bird watching spots in the country.". And Foxton Beach is a popular swimming and fishing spot, that is patrolled in the weekends and public holidays in summer by the Foxton Surf Life Saving Club.

Origins 
The first inhabitants of the Manawatu area were Māori who probably arrived in the thirteenth or fourteenth century. Compared to other parts of the North Island the district was sparsely populated, but there was a major marae at Matakarapa, across the river from Te Awahou (now Foxton) as well as kāinga (villages) and pā (fortified villages) along much of the river. A number of tribes have occupied the area; the Rangitāne had replaced the Ngāti Ara and the Ngāti Mamoe by the 1800s and were in their turn invaded by the Ngāti Toa and allies so that in the 1840s the site of Te Awahou (which was to become Foxton) was occupied by the Ngāti Ngarongo and Ngati Takihiku under the leadership of Ihakara Tukumaru.

Foxton is the oldest European settlement in the southern Manawatu, although it was not the first. The original white settlement was Paiaka to the east, closer to the present town of Shannon in 1844. When Paiaka was largely destroyed by an earthquake in 1855 the settlers moved downstream to Te Awahou, which was named "Foxton" from 1866. In the early years of European settlement it was an important trading post and shipping port as the sea was the easiest way to transport goods and people to the Manawatu. The Manawatu River was then the main access to the rich hinterland. The west coast of the lower North Island is not naturally supplied with harbours and the Foxton harbour had a dangerous bar at the river mouth. As the only real harbour between Whanganui and Wellington it was used anyway.

History 
Foxton was named after Sir William Fox, and has a history of flax stripping, which was used to make wool packs, matting and rope. Other industries associated with the town have included clothing manufacturing and sawmilling. The town is known for producing the soda drink Foxton Fizz, although the products are now made in Putāruru.

Early on, Foxton became a thriving regional centre, and with that status came a newspaper - the Manawatu Herald (est. in 1878).

It was only with the advent of the Palmerston North-Wellington railway that Palmerston North began to overtake it as the most important centre in the Manawatu.  The central government had originally proposed that Foxton was to be on the route of the main line from Wellington to Auckland via Palmerston North, and a tramway linking Foxton and Palmerston North was upgraded into the Foxton Branch railway in the 1870s.  However, due to government delays in extending the line further south, a group of Wellingtonian businessmen established the Wellington and Manawatu Railway (WMR), which announced in February 1881 that the "West Coast" line would run to Longburn, bypassing Foxton. This was a shorter and more direct route to Napier and Auckland, and avoided "unproductive country".

When this line opened in 1886, Foxton's status as a port slipped, and this position deteriorated further when the WMR was incorporated into the government's national rail network in 1908. The branch railway closed in 1959, leaving only road access to the town.

The mycologist Kathleen Curtis (1892–1994) was born in Foxton.

Flax booms
The local Flax Stripper Museum tells the history of the once thriving flax industry, and claims Foxton as the Flax Capital of New Zealand.

NZ Flax (Phormium tenax) played a major role in Foxton's development; indeed Foxton, rather than being a "gold town" or "coal town" was indisputably a "flax town", sending their product overseas to be used worldwide as a substitute for manila.

The first traders at Paiaka and Shannon traded mostly for flax from the Maori, which was sent to Sydney. The first of the flax booms began in 1869, lasting for four years during which 22,000 tonnes of fibre passed through Foxton's port. The late 1880s saw a short-lived flax boom that briefly allowed Foxton to once again grow and function as a bustling port.

A third flax boom, begun in 1898, was the most lasting and saw another increase in shipping, with over 10 steamers making regular visits. In 1903 the Moutoa Estate was developed as the main supply of flax. By 1908 problems with river silting and bar strandings meant that coastal shipping was avoiding Foxton. By 1916 there were only two ships coming into the port but in that year 97,000 bales of flax were shipped out from Foxton.

The Whirokino Cut
Deforestation of the inland Manawatu District in the late nineteenth century meant increased flooding and led to the creation of stopbanks, floodgates, and the Whirokino Cut. Completed in 1943 as part of the Lower Manawatu Flood Control Scheme, it was intended as a spillway but an unexpected flood broke through the upper end and diverted the river down the spillway, cutting off the Foxton loop of the river  and causing great outcry at the time. The Ministry of Works said this was unintentional, but some residents felt it was done purposefully. The Foxton Loop now only has a tidal flow and is not connected to the river at its top end, the upper end of the Loop having silted up during a flood in 1953.

Though the Whirokino Cut is sometimes claimed as the reason Foxton failed to operate as a port, the dangerous bar and persistent silting were already providing problems and by the time the Cut was in place most shipping was already avoiding Foxton – it had already ceased to function as a port as early as 1942.

What always has remained though, is Foxton's unique natural environment. The nearby Foxton Beach offers wetlands of international significance with godwits and multiple species of other rare birdlife, and a beach with plenty of surf, swimmers and fishermen and women.

Demographics

Foxton, comprising the statistical areas of Foxton North and Foxton South, had a population of 3,147 at the 2018 New Zealand census, an increase of 261 people (9.0%) since the 2013 census, and an increase of 189 people (6.4%) since the 2006 census. There were 1,260 households. There were 1,536 males and 1,617 females, giving a sex ratio of 0.95 males per female, with 627 people (19.9%) aged under 15 years, 516 (16.4%) aged 15 to 29, 1,275 (40.5%) aged 30 to 64, and 729 (23.2%) aged 65 or older.

Ethnicities were 79.1% European/Pākehā, 35.1% Māori, 3.6% Pacific peoples, 2.8% Asian, and 1.0% other ethnicities (totals add to more than 100% since people could identify with multiple ethnicities).

The proportion of people born overseas was 9.6%, compared with 27.1% nationally.

Although some people objected to giving their religion, 55.0% had no religion, 31.4% were Christian, 0.2% were Hindu, 0.4% were Buddhist and 3.7% had other religions.

Of those at least 15 years old, 201 (8.0%) people had a bachelor or higher degree, and 864 (34.3%) people had no formal qualifications. The employment status of those at least 15 was that 930 (36.9%) people were employed full-time, 321 (12.7%) were part-time, and 162 (6.4%) were unemployed.

Kere Kere

Kere Kere had a population of 915 at the 2018 New Zealand census, an increase of 57 people (6.6%) since the 2013 census, and an increase of 108 people (13.4%) since the 2006 census. There were 348 households. There were 483 males and 429 females, giving a sex ratio of 1.13 males per female. The median age was 40.1 years (compared with 37.4 years nationally), with 183 people (20.0%) aged under 15 years, 174 (19.0%) aged 15 to 29, 423 (46.2%) aged 30 to 64, and 135 (14.8%) aged 65 or older.

Ethnicities were 87.9% European/Pākehā, 16.4% Māori, 2.3% Pacific peoples, 3.9% Asian, and 2.0% other ethnicities (totals add to more than 100% since people could identify with multiple ethnicities).

The proportion of people born overseas was 11.1%, compared with 27.1% nationally.

Although some people objected to giving their religion, 58.7% had no religion, 28.9% were Christian and 3.6% had other religions.

Of those at least 15 years old, 93 (12.7%) people had a bachelor or higher degree, and 168 (23.0%) people had no formal qualifications. The median income was $35,900, compared with $31,800 nationally. The employment status of those at least 15 was that 426 (58.2%) people were employed full-time, 114 (15.6%) were part-time, and 18 (2.5%) were unemployed.

Climate 
The area is sand country with a temperate climate, average monthly temperatures ranging from 8 °C (July) to 17.4 °C (January), with a minimum/maximum of −4 °C to 27 °C. Foxton has an average of about 2,000 sunshine hours a year, and average precipitation of about 900 mm annually. The prevailing winds in the area are west-northwest and have driven the sand back from the coast to create the most extensive transgressive sand dune system in New Zealand.

Transport 
SH1 runs through Foxton.
The town is served by three InterCity buses a day and a commuter bus runs to Palmerston North at 7:05am, returning at 5:20pm. There is also a shoppers' bus to Levin on Fridays.

Features

Te Awahou Nieuwe Stroom and the Cultural Park is located in the centre of town. The fully restored BNZ building on Main Street, and the oldest cottage in the region 'Nye Cottage' on Harbour Street are both within view of the Park. In 2003, a full size replica of a Dutch windmill, called De Molen was completed and opened.  This working Stellingmolen windmill produces stone-ground flour, which can be purchased inside the mill's Dutch Deli. Visitors can climb up three floors, to witness the wooden mechanical workings of the mill in action - examples of traditional Dutch 17th Century engineering. The miller sets the blades in motion on windy days, and is available for tours to explain the history of milling, or for a more casual conversation.

The Foxton Fizz factory, opened in 1918, is open to visitors.

The National Museum of Audio Visual Arts & Sciences, also known as the MAVTech Museum, opened in the 1970s. It's located in authentic restored movie theatre, first opened as the Coronation Hall in 1911, was exhibits the development of audiovisual technology.

The Foxton Courthouse building houses the Foxton Museum, which was closed due to earthquake risk.

Flax Stripper Museum, a museum about the area's flax industry history, opened in 1990.

Education

References

External links
 Foxton, New Zealand

 
Populated places in Manawatū-Whanganui
Populated places on the Manawatū River